The spinalis is a portion of the erector spinae, a bundle of muscles and tendons, located nearest to the spine. It is divided into three parts: Spinalis dorsi, spinalis cervicis, and spinalis capitis.

Spinalis dorsi
Spinalis dorsi, the medial continuation of the sacrospinalis, is scarcely separable as a distinct muscle. It is situated at the medial side of the longissimus dorsi, and is intimately blended with it; it arises by three or four tendons from the spinous processes of the first two lumbar and the last two thoracic vertebrae: these, uniting, form a small muscle which is inserted by separate tendons into the spinous processes of the upper thoracic vertebrae, the number varying from four to eight.

It is intimately united with the semispinalis dorsi, situated beneath it.

Spinalis cervicis
Spinalis cervicis, or spinalis colli, is an inconstant muscle, which arises from the lower part of the nuchal ligament, the spinous process of the seventh cervical, and sometimes from the spinous processes of the first and second thoracic vertebrae, and is inserted into the spinous process of the axis, and occasionally into the spinous processes of the two cervical vertebrae below it.

Spinalis capitis
Spinalis capitis (biventer cervicis) is usually inseparably connected with the semispinalis capitis.

Spinalis capitis is not well characterized in modern anatomy textbooks and atlases, and is often
omitted from anatomical illustration. However, it can be identified as fibers that extend from the spinous processes of TV1 and CV7 to the cranium, often blending with semispinalis capitis

See also
 Iliocostalis
 Longissimus
 Semispinalis muscle

References

External links
  - "Intrinsic muscles of the back."
 Dissection at ithaca.edu

Muscles of the torso